"I'm in Miami Bitch" (clean version "I'm in Miami Trick") is the debut single of American hip hop/electronic duo LMFAO. It was officially released to radio in 2008. It peaked at No. 51 on the U.S. Billboard Hot 100 chart in July 2009. The song has also charted on the Canadian Hot 100, peaking at No. 37.

The official remix features American rapper Pitbull.

This song is the theme song for the 2009 reality television program Kourtney and Khloé Take Miami. A "New York" version was used for the 2011 reality television program Kourtney and Kim Take New York.

Music video
The music video for "I'm in Miami Trick" was uploaded to YouTube by LMFAO on October 5, 2009. The music video exists in an explicit and a clean version which both feature several girls in polka-dot bikinis, including the porn star Jenny Hendrix.

Charts

Notes
Original version was not released as a single in the UK, the song charted because of strong downloads from the Party Rock album.

Chuckie remix

In early 2009, Chicago DJ/producer 'DJ Inphinity' created a bootleg using the Silvio Ecomo remix of DJ Chuckie's 2008 hit "Let the Bass Kick" and the a cappella of LMFAO, creating "Let the Bass Kick in Miami Bitch" (or "Let the Bass Kick in Miami Girl" as a radio edit). The bootleg was spread across the Internet and was a massive success at the Miami Winter Music Conference 2009. "Let the Bass Kick in Miami Bitch/Girl" was released in Europe in late 2009, peaking within the top ten of the charts in the United Kingdom, and peaked within the top 20 of the charts in Belgium (Flanders) and the Netherlands. In the former country, "Let the Bass Kick in Miami Bitch/Girl" peaked at number nine on the UK Singles Chart and topped the UK Dance Chart, making the United Kingdom the only territory in which "Gettin' Over You" was not LMFAO's first top ten song.

Charts

"I'm in Your City Trick" 
In July 2009, a compilation album of mostly clean versions of "I'm in Miami Bitch", with Miami swapped out for numerous US cities, known as "I'm in Your City Trick", was released. The album, totaling 51 tracks (including the explicit versions for San Diego ("I'm in Diego Bitch"), Las Vegas ("I'm in Las Vegas Bitch"), San Francisco ("I'm in the Bay Bitch") and Phoenix ("I'm in the Valley Bitch"), as well as the Boroughs Mix for New York, remixes for Miami and San Diego with Pitbull and a separate remix for Las Vegas), includes cities ranging in population from Los Angeles to New Bedford. Most of these versions were used by local radio stations instead of the original "I'm in Miami Trick".

"I'm in Saint Row Bitch" 
In October 2011, an advert for the video game Saints Row: The Third depicts a similar variation swapping out Miami for Saint's Row. There is however no full release of this version.

Certifications

Release history

References

LMFAO songs
2008 debut singles
2009 singles
2008 songs
American hip hop songs
Music videos directed by Ray Kay
Pitbull (rapper) songs
Songs written by Redfoo
Songs written by Sky Blu (rapper)
Crunk songs